Heroes is an album by Mark O'Connor, in which he plays duets alongside his childhood fiddle heroes, including Jean-Luc Ponty, Benny Thomasson, Byron Berline, Stéphane Grappelli, Johnny Gimble, and others. It crosses a variety of musical genres and contains recordings made from 1976 to 1992.

Track listing

Personnel
Mark O'Connor - fiddle

On New Country:
Jean-Luc Ponty - fiddle 
On The Devil Comes Back to Georgia:
Charlie Daniels - fiddle
Johnny Cash - Vocals
Marty Stuart - Vocals
Travis Tritt - Vocals
On Fiddlin' Around:
Johnny Gimble - fiddle
On Gold Rush:
Byron Berline - fiddle
Bill Monroe - Mandolin
On House of the Rising Sun:
Vassar Clements -fiddle
On Diggy Diggy Lo:
Doug Kershaw
Lionel Cartwright
Clinton Gregory
On Sweet Jole Blon:
Doug Kershaw - fiddle
On Sadness/Darlin' Waltz:
Buddy Spicher - fiddle
On Jerusalem's Ridge:
Kenny Baker - fiddle
On Sally Johnson:
Terry Morris - fiddle
Texas Shorty - fiddle
Benny Thomasson - fiddle
On Ashokan Farewell:
Pinchas Zukerman - fiddle
On This Can't Be Love:
Stéphane Grappelli - fiddle
On Ain't Misbehavin''':
Stéphane Grappelli - fiddle
On Nomad'':
L. Shankar - 10-string double fiddle
also
Mark O'Connor - Producer
Mark O'Connor - Mixer
Rob Feaster - Mixer for tracks 2,6, and 7
Mark O'Connor - Music Editing
Denny Purcell - Mastering
Craig Miller - Executive Producer
Laura LiPuma-Nash - Art Direction/Design
Kip Lott - Photography/Background Painting
Jonita Aadland - Additional Photos
Jim Dant - Gold violin

Chart performance

Notes 

Mark O'Connor albums
1993 albums
Instrumental duet albums
Warner Records albums
Albums produced by Jim Ed Norman